CIIA may refer to the:

Canadian Institute of International Affairs, now the Canadian International Council
Certified International Investment Analyst, (CIIA) - a global investment designation offered by EFFAS and ASAF.
Chartered Institute of Internal Auditors
Christmas Island Internet Administration
 Critical Infrastructure Information Act of 2002, Title II of the Homeland Security Act

lt:CIIA